Anita O'Day Collates is a 1953 album by Anita O'Day.

It was a 10-inch LP containing eight songs. It was re-released as Anita O'Day by Norgran Records in 1955 and with four additional tracks as The Lady Is A Tramp on the Verve label in 1957.

Track listing

Side One
 "Rock 'N' Roll Blues" (Anita O'Day) — 3:17
 "Love for Sale" (Cole Porter) — 3:34
 "Lover, Come Back to Me" (Sigmund Romberg, Oscar Hammerstein II) — 2:27
 "Lullaby of the Leaves" (Bernice Petkere) — 3:08

Side Two
 "The No Soap, No Hope, No Mouse, No House Blues" (Jerry Ross) — 2:32
 "The Lady Is a Tramp" (Richard Rodgers, Lorenz Hart) — 2:39
 "Speak Low" (Kurt Weill, Ogden Nash) — 2:34
 "Strawberry Moon" (Sammy Mysels, Bob Hilliard) — 3:08

Additional tracks on the 1957 version
 "Pagan Love Song" (Arthur Freed, Nacio Herb Brown)
 "Ain't This A Wonderful Day"
 "Somebody's Crying"
 "Vaya con Dios" (Larry Russell, Inez James, Buddy Pepper)

Personnel
Anita O'Day - vocals
Roy Eldridge - trumpet (Side One)
Bill Harris - trombone (Side One)
Budd Johnson - tenor sax (Side One)
Cecil Payne - baritone sax (Side One)
Ralph Burns - piano, arranger (Side One)
Al McKibbon - bass (Side One)
Don Lamond - drums (Side One)
Roy Kral - piano, arranger (Side Two)
Earl Backus - guitar (Side Two)
Johnny Frigo bass (Side Two)
Robert "Red" Lionberg - drums (Side Two)
Jim Wilson - bongos (Side Two)

1953 albums
Anita O'Day albums
Albums produced by Norman Granz
Clef Records albums